Stiromoides is a genus of true bugs belonging to the family Delphacidae.

Species:
 Stiromoides maculiceps (Horváth, 1903)

References

Delphacidae